Lake Lurleen State Park is a publicly owned recreation area located on U.S. Highway 82 approximately  northwest of Northport in Tuscaloosa County, Alabama. The state park's  include  Lake Lurleen and a  trail system. It is operated by the Alabama Department of Conservation and Natural Resources.

History
After purchasing the site of the park in 1952, the state began construction of a dam on a tributary of Big Creek to create a  lake. Various concessionaires operated the park under the name Tuscaloosa County Public Lake from 1956 until 1970, when the state took control and added new facilities. In 1972, the park was renamed after Lurleen Wallace, a native of Tuscaloosa County and Alabama's first female governor, who had died in office four years earlier.

Activities and amenities
Lake Lurleen is used for swimming, boating and fishing, and is stocked with largemouth bass, bream, catfish and crappie. The state park offers 91 campsites and a  system of trails that encircles the lake for hiking and mountain biking. The trail system was designated as a National Recreation Trail in 2011.

References

External links

Lake Lurleen State Park Alabama Department of Conservation and Natural Resources
Lake Lurleen State Park Trail Map Alabama Department of Conservation and Natural Resources

State parks of Alabama
Protected areas of Tuscaloosa County, Alabama
Protected areas established in 1952
1952 establishments in Alabama
National Recreation Trails in Alabama